Lord Claud Hamilton PC (27 July 1813 – 3 June 1884) was a British Conservative politician. He notably served as Treasurer of the Household in 1852 and between 1858 and 1859 and as Vice-Chamberlain of the Household between 1866 and 1868.

Background and education
Hamilton was the second son of James Hamilton, Viscount Hamilton, eldest son of John Hamilton, 1st Marquess of Abercorn. His mother was Harriet Douglas, daughter of the Honourable John Douglas, younger son of James Douglas, 14th Earl of Morton. James Hamilton, 1st Duke of Abercorn, was his elder brother. He was educated at Harrow and Trinity College, Cambridge.

Political career
Hamilton sat as Member of Parliament for County Tyrone from 1835 to 1837 and again from 1839 to 1874. When the Conservatives came to power in February 1852 under the Earl of Derby, Hamilton was admitted to the Privy Council and appointed Treasurer of the Household, a post he held until the government fell in December 1852. He held the same office under Derby from 1858 to 1859. When Derby became prime minister for a third time in 1866, Hamilton was promoted to Vice-Chamberlain of the Household, a position he retained until 1868, the last year under the premiership of Benjamin Disraeli. He could talk fluently and well on almost any topic at indefinite length. One of his speeches lasted four hours and twenty minutes, one of the longest then on record in the House of Commons.

Family
Hamilton married Lady Elizabeth Proby, daughter of Granville Proby, 3rd Earl of Carysfort, on 7 August 1844. They had one son and three daughters. Hamilton's wife Elizabeth was the translator from French to English of 'Louis Pasteur: His life and times' by Pasteur's son-in-law. His only son Douglas became a soldier and Member of Parliament while his grandson Richard was created a Baronet in 1952 (see Proby Baronets). A daughter, Louisa Hamilton, married physicist John Tyndall. Hamilton died in June 1884, aged 70. Lady Elizabeth survived him by sixteen years and died in June 1900.

References

External links 
 

1813 births
1884 deaths
Members of the Parliament of the United Kingdom for County Tyrone constituencies (1801–1922)
UK MPs 1835–1837
UK MPs 1837–1841
UK MPs 1841–1847
UK MPs 1847–1852
UK MPs 1852–1857
UK MPs 1857–1859
UK MPs 1859–1865
UK MPs 1865–1868
UK MPs 1868–1874
Irish Conservative Party MPs
Younger sons of marquesses
Treasurers of the Household
People educated at Harrow School
Alumni of Trinity College, Cambridge
Members of the Privy Council of the United Kingdom